New Englander may refer to:
New Englanders, the inhabitants of the New England region in the Northeastern United States
The New Englander, now Yale Review, a literary magazine 
New Englander (cocktail), a drink
New Englander, now Armidale Express, an Australian newspaper
A New Englander Over-Sea, a pen name for American writer, critic, and activist, John Neal

See also

New England (disambiguation)